The Prieska–Total Solar Power Station, also Mulilo Prieska Solar Power Station, is an 86 megawatts solar power plant in South Africa. The solar farm was developed and is owned by a consortium comprising five independent power producers (IPPs), development finance companies and private investment firms. The power station owners formed a special purpose vehicle (SPV) company called Mulilo Prieska PV (RF), to design, finance, construct, own, operate and maintain the power station and related infrastructure. The off-taker of the energy generated here is Eskom Holdings, the public electricity utility parastatal of South Africa. A 20-year power purchase agreement between Murillo Prieska PV and Eskom, governs the sale and purchase of electricity between the power station and the electric utility.

Location
The geographical coordinates of the solar farm are: 30°02'05.0"S, 22°18'53.0"E (Latitude:-30.034722; Longitude:22.314722).

Overview
The design calls or ground-mounted photo-voltaic cells, with capacity rating of 86 megawatts. However, the 20-year PPA between the parties calls for the supply and purchase of 75 megawatts. Eskom buys the energy and integrates it into the national South African grid.

Ownership
The table below illustrates the shareholding in the SPV company that owns, operates and maintains the power station.

Cost
The cost pf construction is reported at US$200 million.

Construction
Construction began in 2015 and was completed in December 2016. SunPower, an affiliate of TotalEnergies was awarded the engineering, procurement and construction contract. They are also the operations and maintenance contractor.

See also
 List of power stations in South Africa

References

External links
 Mulilo Prieska solar photovoltaic power plant project, South Africa As of 28 March 2014.

Solar power stations in South Africa
Economy of the Northern Cape
2016 establishments in South Africa
Energy infrastructure completed in 2016
Pixley ka Seme District Municipality
21st-century architecture in South Africa